Empty is God Lives Underwater's first full-length album and second major release overall, released in October 1995 via American Recordings.  Several songs from this album have featured in movies: "Tortoise" was used in the movie National Lampoon's Senior Trip, "No More Love" was used in Johnny Mnemonic, and "Weight"—an outtake from Empty—was featured in Mortal Kombat: More Kombat.

Track listing
All songs written by David Reilly and Jeff Turzo, except where noted.

Original version
"Still" – 3:28
"All Wrong" – 4:55
"Fool" – 4:11
"Empty" – 4:06
"Don't Know How To Be" – 3:35
"No More Love" – 4:18
"23" – 4:05
"We Were Wrong" (Andrew McGee, Reilly, Turzo) – 3:08
"Weaken" – 5:31
"Tortoise" – 2:57
"Scared" – 2:44

Personnel 
God Lives Underwater
 David Reilly - lead vocals, keyboards, programming
 Jeff Turzo - guitars, bass, keyboards, programming
 Andrew McGee - guitars
 Adam Kary - drums

References

1995 debut albums
God Lives Underwater albums
American Recordings (record label) albums
Albums produced by Rick Rubin